Hay que romper la rutina is a 1974 Argentine film.

Cast

External links
 

1974 films
1970s Spanish-language films
Argentine sex comedy films
1970s sex comedy films
1974 comedy films
Films directed by Enrique Cahen Salaberry
1970s Argentine films